The Ambassador from Syria to the United States is Syria's foremost diplomatic representative in the United States, and in charge of Syria's diplomatic mission in the US.

List of heads of mission

Ambassadors to the US
March 19, 1945–1947: Nazim al-Kudsi
1947–1952: Fares al-Khoury
1952–1957: Farid Zayn Al-Din
1961–1964: Omar Abu-Riche
1964–1967: N/A
1967–1974: No diplomatic relations due to the Six-Day War
1974–1981: Sabah Kabbani
1981–1986: Rafic Jouejati
1990–2000: Walid Muallem
2000–2003: Rostom Al-Zoubi
2004–2011: Imad Moustapha
October 24, 2011–present: Syria and US withdraw ambassadors due to the Syrian civil war

See also
 Syria–United States relations
 United States Ambassador to Syria
 Embassy of Syria in Washington, D.C.

References

United States

Syria